Stef Peeters (born 9 February 1992) is a Belgian professional footballer who plays as a midfielder for Belgian Pro League club Eupen. He formerly played for Genk, Sparta Rotterdam, MVV, Sint-Truiden and Cercle Brugge.

Career

Genk
Born in Meeuwen-Gruitrode, Peeters is a Genk youth exponent, joining them from childhood club Sporting Nevok Gruitrode as a seven-year-old. He made his professional debut for Genk under head coach Mario Been on 19 November 2011, replacing Dániel Tőzsér in the 83rd minute of a 3–0 league win over Westerlo. He signed his first contract three days later, on 22 November, keeping him at Genk until 2013.

On 1 January 2013, Peeters was sent on a one-and-a-half-season loan to Sparta Rotterdam, after extending his contract with Genk until 2015. He made his debut for Sparta as a starter on 3 February 2013 in a 1–0 victory against Cambuur in the Eerste Divisie. Peeters scored his first professional goal exactly one year later, on 3 February 2014, opening the score in Sparta's 2–1 away win over Jong PSV.

MVV
Ahead of the 2014–15 season, Peeters was sent on loan to Eerste Divisie club MVV alongside fellow Genk players Jordy Croux, Willem Ofori-Appiah and Alessio Alessandro as part of the two clubs' cooperation agreement. He made his debut for the club on 8 August 2014 in a 5–0 loss away to Almere City in a game where MVV started seven Belgians. On 25 August he scored his first goal for MVV on a penalty-kick in an away win over Jong Twente.

Peeters signed a permanent deal with MVV on 23 June 2015, a one-year contract with an option for an additional season.

Sint-Truiden
In summer 2016, Peeters joined Belgian Pro League side Sint-Truiden from MVV on a two-year deal. During the 2016–17 season he amassed 13 assists and five goals in 39 matches.

Caen
On 22 June 2017, French Ligue 1 Caen announced that they had reached an agreement for the transfer of Peeters on a three-year contract, for a reported fee of €1.5 million.

He made his debut for Caen on 5 August 2017, the opening matchday of the 2017–18 season, replacing Durel Avounou in the 70th minute of a 1–0 away loss to Montpellier. He would mostly remain a substitute during the first half of the season, only making his first league start on 20 December, playing 71 minutes before being subbed off in a 3–1 loss to Paris Saint-Germain. In the second half of the season he became a starter for the club, finishing with a total of 25 appearances for Caen, who managed to avoid relegation.

Eupen
On 7 July 2020, Peeters moved to Eupen. On 10 August, he made his debut for the club in a league game against Oud-Heverlee Leuven.

References

External links
 Stef Peeters on Voetbal International 
 

1992 births
Living people
Association football midfielders
Belgian footballers
Belgian Pro League players
Eerste Divisie players
Ligue 1 players
K.R.C. Genk players
Sparta Rotterdam players
MVV Maastricht players
Sint-Truidense V.V. players
Stade Malherbe Caen players
S.V. Zulte Waregem players
Cercle Brugge K.S.V. players
K.A.S. Eupen players
Belgian expatriate footballers
Expatriate footballers in the Netherlands
Expatriate footballers in France
Belgian expatriate sportspeople in the Netherlands
Belgian expatriate sportspeople in France
People from Meeuwen-Gruitrode
Footballers from Limburg (Belgium)